Balvino Gálvez Jerez (born March 31, 1964) is a former Major League Baseball pitcher in the 1980s to the early 2000s. Galvez who pitched part of one season for the Los Angeles Dodgers and numerous minor league affiliates then traveled to East Asia for five seasons for the Yomiuri Giants in the Nippon Professional Baseball League of Japanese baseball. He also played briefly for teams in South Korea and Taiwan.

Professional career
He played in 10 major league games that year, but was demoted to the minors at the start of the 1987 season and never appeared in another MLB game. Over the next several years, Galvez also suited up for minor league affiliates teams of the Detroit Tigers, Minnesota Twins, New York Yankees of the American League, along with National League teams Montreal Expos and the Chicago Cubs in the 1980s and early 1990s.

In 1994, Galvez signed with the Brother Elephants of  the national capital of Taipei in the Chinese Professional Baseball League on the island nation of Taiwan (with the Nationalist government of the Republic of China since 1949 after the Chinese Civil War). In two full seasons with the Elephants, he had a 26–16 record with an ERA of 2.53 and 203 strikeouts in 370 innings pitched.

He traveled to Japan in  where baseball had a fevered fan base of followers since the early 20th century shared with the Americans who  introduced the sport. Galvez was signed during spring training by the Yomiuri Giants, the most famous Japanese baseball team in the Nippon Professional Baseball League. He ended up with 16 wins, tying teammate Masaki Saito for the most wins in the Central League of the NPBL. The Giants won the Central League pennant that year, playing in the Japan Series of the championship tournament.

Gálvez displayed a distinct pitching form in Japan, often releasing the ball while sticking out his tongue. He had a mid-90 mph fastball and surprisingly good control. However, he was not comfortable when there were runners on base, and had trouble pitching from the set position. He also  showed frequent dissatisfaction with ball and strike calls; a trait which would lead him into clashes with opposing teams and umpires.

On July 31, the Giants played against the Hanshin Tigers at Koshien Stadium, and Gálvez faced Tomochika Tsuboi, a heavy hitter in the bottom of the 6th inning. Galvez had a borderline pitch called a ball by the umpire, Atsushi Kittaka, and he subsequently lost his composure, giving up a home run to Tsuboi on the next pitch. Giants manager Shigeo Nagashima emerged from the dugout to change pitchers, but Gálvez refused to leave the mound, instead shouting insults at Kittaka. Gálvez allowed his teammates to drag him back towards the dugout, but then he turned back to throw the baseball at Kittaka (the ball narrowly missed him).

The game was a huge mess afterwards, with both teams involved in arguments and physical confrontations. The next game between the Tigers and Giants also erupted into a brawl, and both teams were warned for throwing dangerous pitches during the August 2nd contest. Galvez was given a season-ending suspension for throwing at the umpire.

The Giants could have released Gálvez for causing such an incident, but they chose to re-sign him for  because the team's main starters, (Masaki Saito, Hiromi Makihara and Masumi Kuwata) were showing signs of aging. Gálvez actually ended up being the team's Opening Day starter, becoming the first non-Japanese player to pitch Opening Day for the Giants. He pitched decently throughout the season, but was given very little run support, resulting in a 9–12 record in 1999. He still figured as an important part of the Giants' starting rotation, though, and was kept for the following season.

Gálvez had stiff competition in 2000 for his spot on the top team roster during spring training, as the Giants had signed three other non-Japanese pitchers during the offseason. This made 10 consecutive losses, counting his four losses at the end of the previous year.

He was demoted to the Giants' farm team in the Japanese minors after his sixth loss and was released by the club at the end of the season. Although his temperamental ways, particularly the 1998 incident, tarnished his reputation in Japan, he still compiled a 46–43 record in his five seasons there.

However, it was discovered that he had traveled to Korea without a working visa, and he was sued by the opposing team (Hanwha Eagles). However, after the visa situation was resolved, Galvez was a standout pitcher for the Samsung team, compiling a 10–4 record.

Before going to Korea to play with Samsung in 2001, Galvez had signed with the Pittsburgh Pirates of the National League back in the U.S.A. and pitched well enough in spring training to be in contention for the team's #5 starting pitcher spot. But a dispute with the Pirates' pitching coach on April 1 led to another temperamental outburst from Galvez and he quit the team.

External links

1964 births
Living people
Albuquerque Dukes players
Brother Elephants players
Columbus Clippers players
Dominican Republic expatriate baseball players in Japan
Dominican Republic expatriate baseball players in Mexico
Dominican Republic expatriate baseball players in South Korea
Dominican Republic expatriate baseball players in Taiwan
Dominican Republic expatriate baseball players in the United States
Glens Falls Tigers players
Gulf Coast Dodgers players
Indianapolis Indians players
Jacksonville Expos players
KBO League pitchers
Lethbridge Dodgers players
Los Angeles Dodgers players
Major League Baseball pitchers
Major League Baseball players from the Dominican Republic
Mexican League baseball pitchers
Nippon Professional Baseball pitchers
Orlando Cubs players
Orlando Twins players
Portland Beavers players
Samsung Lions players
San Antonio Missions players
Vero Beach Dodgers players
Tigres del México players
Yomiuri Giants players